Army of Two: The 40th Day is a third-person shooter video game developed by EA Montreal and published by Electronic Arts for PlayStation 3 and Xbox 360. The game was also released for PlayStation Portable, which was developed by Buzz Monkey. It is the sequel to Army of Two. Army of Two: The 40th Day was released in January 2010 worldwide.

The 40th Day focuses on two-player cooperative play and employs a cover system. It features Tyson Rios and Elliot Salem, the two protagonists from the original game, as combatant partners who, with the assistance of their handler Alice Murray, must fight to survive and prevail over invading forces that have engulfed Shanghai, China in a devastating terrorist attack.

A sequel to The 40th Day, entitled Army of Two: The Devil's Cartel, has been developed by EA Montreal and Visceral Games and was released on March 26, 2013.

Gameplay
Weapons and upgrades are available, with interchangeable upgrades between weapons such as adding the barrel of one assault rifle to another. The "pimped" option returns along with new camouflage schemes. Weapons can now also be obtained from dead enemies, increasing the player's arsenal to four weapons, along with grenades. Bullets will be able to penetrate weaker materials such as wood and sheet metal. Certain weapons and weapon lockers can only be unlocked by morality moments. Weapon parts can be obtained in the game for free, either by searching armored boxes (which are locked as soon as the enemy guarding it detects the player's presence), rescuing hostages, or simply exploring.

New Heavy enemy types appear as bosses. They wear thick armor and often require a special method of attack to defeat, such as shooting gas canisters or grenade bags that they carry. The Heavy enemies carry weapons such as a flamethrower and a Gatling gun that cannot be unlocked by the player, though they can be picked up and temporarily used after the Heavy is defeated.

Co-op playbook
The 40th Day expands on and refines the cooperative play featured in the original game. Players can use co-op moves at any time. The playbook allows players to scan enemies prior to engaging them in order to set up particular team-based tactics. For example, players can mock surrender or set up simultaneous sniper shots. This is in addition to using aggro as a mechanic for tactically engaging enemies in the midst of combat.

Aggro
Aggro is a system that allows two players to tactically control the target of their enemy's attacks and possibly change the outcome of a firefight. Aggro is measured by a HUD element that displays which player the enemy characters are currently focusing on. By performing aggressive actions, such as firing one's weapon at enemies, a player generates aggro and in turn causes enemies to focus more of their attention on that player, and less attention on the player with less aggro. While one player has aggro, the other is usually being ignored and as a result, can then freely perform actions such as flanking or sniping. In The 40th Day, additional non-aggressive actions can affect aggro. For example, by performing a mock surrender the enemy combatants will focus all of their attention on the player that is surrendering, allowing the other to perform a surprise attack. Some non-aggressive acts can be performed cooperatively as well.

Morality moments

In The 40th Day players are forced to make moral decisions that affect the story of the game. At pre-determined points in the game, players will be presented with a choice. For example, whether they should steal weapons from a mall security armory or vacate the premises. The decision is not a vote between two players, but instead either player must decide while the other player is forced to accept the ramifications of that decisions regardless of what their preference was. The outcome and presentation of these morality moments takes the form of comic panels created by the popular artists Chris Bachalo, Jamie Mendoza and Jock.

Multiplayer
Multiplayer in The 40th Day includes region-free play, client-server connections, and an increased number of participants.

The 40th Day maintains its focus on cooperative gameplay by requiring that players play in a partnership. Partners are a source for ammunition and are able to revive their fallen teammate. There are four multiplayer game modes:
Co-op Deathmatch pits teams of two against other partnerships.
Control awards points to teams for capturing and defending randomly spawned points.
Warzone has players battle over various objectives.
Extraction is a game mode where teams of four fight waves of increasingly powerful enemies in order to clear the map for extraction.

Downloadable content
A DLC titled Chapters of Deceit was released on Xbox Live and PlayStation Network on April 1, 2010. It features two new campaign levels: "The Assassination" and "Collateral Damage", which attempt to bridge the plot gap between Mission 004: The Hospital and 005: The Mall.

Plot
After establishing Trans World Operations (TWO), private military contractors Tyson Rios and Elliot Salem head to Shanghai, where they are tasked with meeting their contact, JB. He leads the two to a back alley to collect their gear and weapons before proceeding to plant locator beacons throughout strategic locations in Shanghai. After planting the last of the beacons and an encounter with overzealous security guards, they regroup on a rooftop of a building.

Handler Alice Murray radios in and tells them they will get extra cash for terminating JB; Rios and Salem can either choose to kill him or lie to Alice about his escape. Following JB's fate, Shanghai comes under attack by terrorists, ravaging the city. Rios and Salem barely escape the building and encounter the 40th Day Initiative mercenaries attempting to kill them. They manage to contact Alice, who informs them that she is alive but trapped in the South African Consulate. They head for the consulate, dispatching groups of mercenaries well as encountering civilian hostages, whom they either rescue or leave behind. Inside the consulate, Rios and Salem discover Alice being held hostage in an office. After freeing her, the three fight their way to the main hall, where a crashed helicopter allows them to escape into the underground tunnels.

Rios and Salem pass through the tunnels and a highway, rescuing hostages and fighting through the mercenaries. They manage to make their way to the Shanghai Zoo where they encounter more mercenaries and are guided by the zoo employees.

After leaving the zoo, Rios and Salem are contacted by Alice, who has managed to reach a safe area and instructs them to locate a communications tower to signal for help. Rios and Salem fight through rooftops to reach the communication tower, but they only find an empty room. They decide to continue searching and jump to an adjacent balcony, but it suddenly gives way, and Salem plummets down to the ground and is knocked unconscious. Salem awakens 24 hours later in a hospital, where they are met by Dr. Wu, who asks for their help in evacuating the patients. Rios and Salem defend the hospital from the mercenaries before heading to a nearby mall.

The pair are held captive at the mall until freed by a mercenary named Breznev, who then instructs Rios and Salem to plant bombs to disrupt the mercenaries' communication center. The two successfully plant the bombs and go their separate ways from Breznev. After exiting the mall, Alice contacts the pair that she has a helicopter en route to extract them. Despite their efforts in destroying the defending anti-aircraft guns, the extraction chopper is shot down and destroyed, and Alice is presumed dead.

As Rios and Salem bunker down to rest, they realize that they will not be able to escape and instead decide to exact revenge on the 40th Day Initiative by killing their leader, Jonah Wade. They manage to track him to a heavily fortified temple, and the pair fight through it until they reach the inner sanctum, finally meeting Jonah. Jonah then justifies his actions as a violent social experiment to force the world to turn back from the moral decay that is destroying it while holding a device that he claims is the trigger for a nuclear bomb located deep in the city.

He offers Rios and Salem a choice to make an "Act of Sacrifice" by having one shoot the other or choose to kill him and his invading force, which will detonate the bomb and kill seven million people. Regardless of choice taken, Jonah reveals that the bomb was a hoax. Killing one's partner ends the game with an epilogue where the surviving partner laments taking his friend's life, while Killing Jonah ends the game with an epilogue of him reflecting on his motivations as UN forces begin to move into the city.

Weaponry and equipment

Weapon customization
A predominant feature is the ability to customize weapons using money that is earned through killing enemies and completing tasks. The official Army of Two blog described it as "like Lego with Guns […] every part of your weapon is customizable and interchangeable with parts from other weapons".  The changes to weapons are not only for appearance but also affect the performance and the amount of aggro that they generate. Some weapon characteristics that can be changed are handling, accuracy, ammunition capacity, aggro, and power.

Weapon design contest
A community-oriented weapons design contest was run for The 40th Day. The contest challenged fans and enthusiasts from North America, Italy, France, and the UK to submit an image and brief description of a weapon that they designed. Two weapon designs (one from the North American and one from the European entries) were chosen as winners and will appear in the game for those players who have a saved game present on their game console from the original Army of Two.

The winning entries were chosen on August 6, 2009. The winning entries were the AS-KR1 "The Ass Kicker" Rifle (submitted by Angry Joe show) and the "Grand Pinger" Sniper Launcher (submitted by Uberblargh).

Reception

Army of Two: The 40th Day received mixed reviews from critics. Aggregating review websites GameRankings and Metacritic gave the Xbox 360 version 74.13% and 73/100 and the PlayStation 3 version 72.39% and 74/100. The PlayStation Portable version received reviews with a score of 46.40% and 49/100 on GameRankings and Metacritic. IGN awarded it an 8.5/10: "The morality moments could have posed larger dilemmas and the AI still stumbles at times, but overall, The 40th Day is a great game to blast through". PSM3 Magazine UK awarded it 85%: "It's not the most progressive or technically impressive game on PS3, but the morality system, weapon customization and online co-op elevate it, and it's one of the best cover-to-cover shooters on PS3", while PlayStation: The Official Magazine (US) awarded it 9 out of 10, saying "EA Montreal delivers a rich, over-the-top buddy experience that provides intelligent choices and a tough but fun Die Hard-like vibe that helps lighten the game's dark, gritty atmosphere". While Hardcore Gamer Magazine criticized the game's minor improvements and similarity to the original, it noted that "The 40th Day is more serious, lacking in the "what the hell" moments that peppered the first game."

The 40th Day sold over 246,500 copies during its first month of release.

Sequel

A sequel, Army of Two: The Devil's Cartel, was released in March 2013 on the Xbox 360 and PlayStation 3.

References

External links
Army of Two: The 40th Day official site

2010 video games
Cooperative video games
Split-screen multiplayer games
Electronic Arts games
PlayStation 3 games
PlayStation Portable games
Third-person shooters
Unreal Engine games
Video game sequels
Video games developed in Canada
Video games scored by Tyler Bates
Video games set in Shanghai
Video games with alternate endings
Xbox 360 games
Multiplayer and single-player video games